Vitaliy Pavlov (born 25 June 1988 in Ukrainian SSR) is a Ukrainian professional footballer who plays as a midfielder for Inhulets Petrove. 

He is a product of the Kryvbas Kryvyi Rih Youth school system.

External links 
 Profile at FFU website
 Profile on Football Squads

1988 births
Living people
Ukrainian footballers
Ukrainian Premier League players
FC Kryvbas Kryvyi Rih players
FC Prykarpattia Ivano-Frankivsk (2004) players
FC Hirnyk Kryvyi Rih players
Association football midfielders
Ukrainian First League players